Mount Saint John (Māori: Te Kōpuke; also known as Te Kōpuke / Mount Saint John and Tītīkōpuke), is a volcanic scoria cone and Tūpuna Maunga (ancestral mountain) in Epsom, in the Auckland volcanic field of New Zealand.

Geography and geology

It has a peak 126 metres above sea level and a crater around 125 m wide and 20 m deep. The age of Te Kōpuke Mount / St John is currently unknown but is older than 28,500 years old as the scoria cone is mantled in ash from Te Tatua-a-Riukiuta volcano.

Te Kōpuke / Mount St John is now known to be the source of the long lava flow that ran west down an old stream valley and out into the Waitematā Harbour as Meola Reef. Maungawhau / Mount Eden later erupted through the lava flow.

History

Te Kōpuke means 'the prominent mound' and is an abbreviation of Tītīkōpuke. Mount Saint John was named after Colonel J.H.H. St John, who was prominent in the New Zealand Wars. None of its three names are official. In 2014, the Tāmaki Collective agreed that both Te Kōpuke and Tītīkōpuke reflect the historical association of local Māori with this site. The maunga is a place of great cultural and archaeological significance, and was the site of a pā, and has retained Māori earthworks from that era such as kumara pits and terracing for housing. 

During World War II, an anti-aircraft artillery as built on Mount Saint John, in order to protect the city of Auckland. In 1957, a water reservoir was constructed on the peak, buried underneath the eastern rim of the crater.

In the 2014 Treaty of Waitangi settlement between the Crown and the Ngā Mana Whenua o Tāmaki Makaurau collective of 13 Auckland iwi and hapu (also known as the Tāmaki Collective), ownership of the 14 Tūpuna Maunga of Tāmaki Makaurau / Auckland, was vested to the collective. The legislation specified that the land be held in trust "for the common benefit of Ngā Mana Whenua o Tāmaki Makaurau and the other people of Auckland". The Tūpuna Maunga o Tāmaki Makaurau Authority or Tūpuna Maunga Authority (TMA) is the co-governance organisation established to administer the 14 Tūpuna Maunga. Auckland Council manages the Tūpuna Maunga under the direction of the TMA.

References

City of Volcanoes: A geology of Auckland - Searle, Ernest J.; revised by Mayhill, R.D.; Longman Paul, 1981. First published 1964. .
Volcanoes of Auckland: A Field Guide. Hayward, B.W.; Auckland University Press, 2019, 335 pp. .

External links
Photographs of Mount Saint John held in Auckland Libraries' heritage collections.

Auckland volcanic field
Saint